Old Trafford is a cricket ground that is located in Manchester, England. The ground hosted its first Test match in 1884 when England played Australia, 82 Test matches have been played at the ground as of September 2020. The ground has also been the scene of 56 One Day Internationals (ODIs), the first taking place in 1972.

The Englishman Billy Gunn became the first player to score a Test century at Old Trafford. Gunn's innings of 102 not out was made against Australia in 1893. The highest score made at the ground, 311 from 740 deliveries, was achieved by Bob Simpson against England in 1964. It was during the same match that Ken Barrington's score for 256 set the record of the highest innings by an Englishman and remains the second highest overall. Only three other batsman have achieved the feat of scoring a double century at the ground. Denis Compton, Gordon Greenidge and Alec Stewart share the record of most centuries at the ground with three. The ground has witnessed 134 Test centuries.

This ground is also known for being the venue of Sachin Tendulkar's first of 100 centuries in 1990.

Twenty-three ODI centuries have been scored at the ground, the first of these was scored by Dennis Amiss for England against Australia in 1972. The West Indian Viv Richards's score of 189 not out, made against England in 1984, is the highest ODI innings the ground has seen. The record for highest score by an Englishman belongs to Eoin Morgan who made 148 against Afghanistan in the 2019 World Cup.

Indian batsman KL Rahul is the only person to score a T20I century at the venue.

Key
 * denotes that the batsman was not out.
 Inns. denotes the number of the innings in the match.
 Balls denotes the number of balls faced in an innings.
 NR denotes that the number of balls was not recorded.
 Parentheses next to the player's score denotes his century number at Old Trafford.
 The column title Date refers to the date the match started.
 The column title Result refers to whether the player's team won, lost or if the match was drawn.

List of centuries

Test centuries
The following table summarises the Test centuries scored at Old Trafford.

One Day International centuries

The following table summarises the One Day International centuries scored at Old Trafford.

Twenty20 Internationals International centuries

The following table summarises the Twenty20 Internationals centuries scored at the Old Trafford.

References 

Old Trafford
Cricket grounds in Greater Manchester
Centuries
Centuries